The GO Battle League (Japanese: GOバトルリーグ GO Battle League), sometimes shortened to the GBL, is a feature in Pokémon GO which allows for competitive, online trainer battles. This was introduced by Niantic on January 28, 2020. The GO Battle League takes course over a Battle League Season so that the league can provide different tournaments, cups, and rewards each and every season. Only trainers who are above level 10 can participate.

In April 2020, the GO Battle League Leaderboard was introduced to show the top 500 trainers in the world.

Initially, players got five battle sets per day, and earned one more for each  walked. This walking requirement has since been lifted due to the COVID-19 pandemic.

Tournaments and Leagues

Leagues

The Great League was the first option out of the three Leagues introduced in the GO Battle League. The Great League only allows Pokémon with a CP (Combat Power) of 1,500 or lower to participate. The Ultra League was the second League rolled out which only allows Pokémon with a CP no higher than 2,500. The last League is called the Master League which has no limit on the number of CP a Pokémon has. Starting from November 30, 2020, Pokémon can be powered up beyond level 40 using Candy XL, prompting a Master League Classic format where Pokémon powered up with Candy XL are excluded.

Season 7 introduced the Great League Remix Cup where the top 10 most used Pokémon in the Great League were banned from competing.
 
Season 8 introduced the Ultra League Remix Cup, and along with Great League Remix, banned Pokémon were expanded to the top 20.

Season Interlude removed the Master League Classic.

Season 11 brought in the Little Cup remix where it banned four Pokémon, which are Bronzor, Cottonee, Deino and Kantoian Vulpix.

Cups

Cups are limited-time, usually themed formats that have limitations on participating Pokémon in addition to their CP. The first Cup introduced in the GO Battle League was the Premier Cup. The Premier Cup bans any Legendary and Mythical Pokémon and has a limit on CP depending on the ongoing League. The second Cup was planned to be the Flying Cup, in which only Pokémon with Flying typing are allowed, and yet again, bans any Legendary and Mythical Pokémon. The participating Pokémon must have a CP under 1,500. Season 4 introduced the Halloween Cup, which allows only Poison-, Ghost-, Bug-, Dark-, and Fairy-type Pokémon, excluding the Legendary and Mythical Pokémon. This is the first Cup where there is a restriction to the type of the participating Pokémon (the Flying Cup was the first Cup of this kind announced, but was delayed and actually held after the Halloween Cup). The Little Cup introduced in Season 5 was the first time where a CP limit (500) other than 1,500 and 2,500 was applied in Trainer Battles.  The Kanto Cup from Season 5 introduced Pokémon region as a restriction. The Catch Cup from Season 5 introduced the catch time of Pokémon as a restriction. The Love Cup from Season 6 introduced the color of Pokémon (according to the Pokédex) as a restriction. Season 7 introduced the Retro Cup, Season 8 introduced the Element Cup, Season 9 introduced the Little Jungle Cup and Season 10 introduced the Sinnoh and Johto Cups respectively.

Seasons

Pre-season
The pre-season of the GO Battle League started on January 29, 2020 and ended on March 13, 2020. The pre-season included only the Great, Ultra and Master League, however, it did not have any GO Battle Cups. In the pre-season, trainers could earn rewards such as, gaining an encounter with the Legendary Pokémon Giratina and Tornadus, and also trainers above rank 4 were offered the Premium Battle Pass.

Season 1
Season 1 was the first season of the GO Battle League. This lasted from March 13, 2020 and ended May 11, 2020. In the season, the Great League ran from March 13, 2020 to March 27, 2020. The Ultra League ran from March 27, 2020 to April 10, 2020, and the Master League ran from April 10 to the 24th. All 3 leagues were available to play on April 24. Players earn items and encounters with rare Pokémon as rewards for winning and climbing up Ranks. At the end of the season, players who reached at least Rank 7 receive an Elite Charged TM.

Season 2
Season 2 was the second season of the GO Battle League. The season ran from May 11, 2020 to July 27, 2020. Season 2 introduced the Premier Cup, a new format in the GO Battle League. The Great League ran from May 11 to June 1, the Ultra League ran from June 1 to June 22, and both the Master League and Premier Cup ran from July 6 to July 20. All three leagues and the Premier Cup were available from June 29 to July 6, upon the start of the Master League and Premier Cup solo. The Season 2 rewards stayed the same as in Season 1, except trainers received an Elite Fast TM instead of an Elite Charged TM for reaching Rank 7. In addition, trainers could be rewarded with different Pokémon encounters.

Season 3
After initially having the technical issues from the end of the previous season, the third season of the GO Battle League took place from July 27 to September 14, 2020. Season 3 introduced the Flying Cup, yet another format in the GO Battle League. The Great League ran from July 27 to August 10, the Ultra League and the Premier Cup solo ran from August 10 to August 24. The Season 3 Premier Cup had a 2,500 CP limit, whereas in the second season, it had no limit. The Master League and the CP no-limit Premier Cup ran from August 24 to September 7. The Flying Cup was planned along with the GO Battle Night, but both were postponed. All 3 leagues and the Premier Cup were available to play from September 7 to the 14th. Mostly all of the rewards are the sane as Season 2, but the reward encounters have changed, with Pidgeot starting at rank 1, the Galarian Zigzagoon starting at rank 4, the Galarian Farfetch'd starting at rank 7, Rufflet starting at rank 8, Scraggy starting at rank 9, and Pikachu Libre starting at rank 10. If the player reaches battle rank 10, a brand-new avatar pose and avatar item are rewarded.

The dominance of Registeel in both the Great League and the Ultra League ended in this season due to the nerfs to both of its staple charged moves Flash Cannon and Focus Blast. The role of a dominant Steel-type Pokémon in the Great League was picked up by Galarian Stunfisk. Buffs to various Ice-, Ghost-, and Flying-type moves popularized Pokémon like Drifblim and Abomasnow and increased the use of Pokémon like Honchkrow and Zapdos. Some Pokémon like Pelipper and Empoleon gained access to new movesets and became more popular.

Season 4
Season 4 introduced the Halloween Cup, which is another format in the Go Battle League. Season 4 ran from September 14 to November 9. The Great League ran from September 14, 2020 to September 2020, the Ultra League and its respective Premier Cup ran from the 28th to October 12, 2020. The Master League and its own Premier Cup ran from the 12 to 24 October 2020. Halloween Cup ran from October 26 to November 3 and allowed only Ghost-, Poison-, Dark-, Bug-, and Fairy-type Pokémon with a CP limit of 1,500. All three leagues and the Premier Cup were made available from November 3 to 9. Players can reach ranks 3 through 9 by winning certain numbers of battles. The rewards are to stay the same as the third season.

Flying Cup, which was planned for Season 3, was eventually held on November 5 along with the originally planned GO Battle Night bonus. Pidgeot acquired in the duration of the Cup learns the new Flying-type move Gust.

With Season 4 came a new Bug-type charged move Lunge and the buff of several existing Bug- and Fire-type charged moves. The popularity of the Bug-type Pokémon Galvantula in the Great league shot up as a result.

Season 5
Running from November 9 to 30, Season 5 was only 3 weeks long and the shortest season yet. This was the first season where players Ranks were solely dependent on the number of battles won. Unlike previous seasons which were each split between 3 Leagues, Season 5 featured 3 unique Cups: the Little Cup from November 9 to 16 allowing only unevolved-and-evolvable Pokémon with a CP limit of 500, the Kanto Cup from November 16 till 23rd confining to Pokémon originally discovered in the Kanto region with a CP limit of 1,500, and the Catch Cup from November 23 through 30th limiting to non-Mythical Pokémon caught after the start of Season 5 and with a CP under 1,500. Legendary Pokémon were back to the catch reward pool starting at Rank 7.

Season 6 
The 3-League format along with Premier Cup for Ultra and Master Leagues returned in Season 6, the first half of which ran from November 30, 2020 to January 11, 2021. The Rank system was overhauled and now had 24 ranks (up from 10). Ranks of up to 20 required participating and winning a certain number of battles, while the final 4 ranks required a certain MMR rating. Since Pokémon can be powered up beyond level 40 using Candy XL as of the start of Season 6, Master League was further split and now included Master League Classic which excluded Pokémon powered up with Candy XL. Holiday Cup was scheduled for December 28, 2020 to January 4, 2021 which was limited to Normal-, Grass-, Electric-, Ice-, Flying-, and Ghost-Type Pokémon with a CP of 1500 or lower. The second half of Season 6 started right after the end of the first half and ran through March 1, 2021. The familiar format of the three main Leagues, Premier Cups, and Kanto Cup returned, and a new Love Cup ran from 8th to 15 February.

Season 7
Season 7 of the GO Battle League started on March 1, 2021, and ended on May 31, 2021. This season also introduced the Retro Cup, in which all Pokémon types except for Steel, Dark, and Fairy types are allowed to participate. The CP cap limit is 1500. It also introduced the Great League Remix. The Great League Remix features an 1500 CP cap, and follows the same rules from the original Great League, except the league bans 10 of the most popular Pokémon from the Great League. The Great League ran from March 1 to March 15, the Ultra League and its Premier Cup from March 15 to March 29, the Master League, Master League Classic, and the Great League again from March 29 to April 5, the Great League, Ultra League, and the Master League again from April 5 to April 12, the Great League Remix from April 12, 2021 to April 26, the Ultra League and its Premier Cup from April 26 to May 10, the Retro Cup from May 10 to May 17, and an unranked Kanto Cup from May 24 to May 31. Some rewards which were included in Season 7 for Standard users were Stardust, Items, and Rare Candies. For Premium users, the rewards included the following for Standard users, plus some Charged TMs. Season 7 boasted possible encounters with Pokémon such as Zebstrika, Poliwhirl, Deino, Lampent, and a Shiny Rufflet.

Season 8
Season 8 of the GO Battle League started on May 31st, 2021 and ended on August 31st, 2021. The season introduced the Element Cup in which only first stage, nonevolved Fire, Grass, and Water types could participate. It also introduced the Ultra League Remix, modeled after Season 7's Great League Remix. It follows the same rules as Ultra League, but The 20 Ultra League Pokémon most used by Trainers Ace rank and up in the Ultra League are banned from Ultra League Remix.  This season also marked the return of Pokémon GO Battle Nights. The first Battle Night took place on June 3, 2021.

After Razor Leaf was nerfed, popular fairy types with access to Charm became even more ubitiquous. Rather than weaken Charm, Season 8 introduced a number of moveset updates and significant buffs for various Poison types, as well as making Draqon Tail do slightly more damage than Dragon Breath but generate less energy (4.33 DPT, 3 EPT). Pidgeot was given a very strong new move, Feather Dance, that unfortunately had bugging issues, leading to the ongoing ban on using Pidgeot in any GBL battles across all leagues. The move was however brought back in Season 9 after some improving.

Season 9 
Season 9 of the GO Battle League started on August 30, 2021 and ended on November 29, 2021. Trainers who reached Legend rank during Season 9 qualified for the Pokémon GO Championship Series (PGO) where the winners of the Championship Series advance to the 2022 Pokémon World Championship. The season introduced the Little Jungle Cup, where only Pokémon under 500 CP and with  Normal, Grass, Electric, Poison, Ground, Flying, Bug, and Dark types were allowed. Shuckle and Smeargle were banned in the Cup. Furthermore, GO Battle Days replaced GO Battle Nights, to make them more accessible. The season also marked the return of the Kanto Cup, selected by vote on Twitter, in which players would earn 3 times more Stardust from win rewards. It also brought back the Premier Classic for both Master and Ultra leagues.

Season 10 
Season 10 of the GO Battle League started on 29 November 2021 and ended on 1 March 2022. The season's end was extended by a day (to March 1) due to the next season, Season 11 being "put on hold" after the developers needed more time to add extra features. The season started with the Great League along with its remix cup from 29 November to 13 December 2021. The Ultra League and its remix cup ran from 13 to 27 December.  From 16 to 31 December saw the return of the Holiday Cup. From 27 December 2021 to 10 January 2022 saw the Master League and the Master League Classic. During this time, 3x Stardust Rewards (not counting end of set rewards) were given. From 10 to 24 January, the Great League returned and a newly formed cup competition, called the Sinnoh Cup. The Sinnoh Cup saw only Pokémon listed from 387 to 493 could participate, with a 1500 CP limit. From 24 January to 7 February, the Ultra League and its Premier Classic Cup were active. From 7 to 21 February, the Master League, its Premier Classic and Love Cup returned for the second time. 3x Stardust Rewards were once again activated during this time frame. From 21 February to 1 March, it ran all three leagues, including another new cup competition where only Johto Pokémon were eligible to participate, and in which the CP limit was 1500.

Interlude Season 
The Interlude Season is the season following Season 10 in the GO Battle League. The season started on 1 March, and will end on 1 June 2022. The Interlude Season acts as an "interval", so GO's battle engineers can be given time to add new features and fix bugs. Because of this, rewards will be based on battles won, but the ratings won't be visible nor will they affect rank.

Season 11 
This season ran from 1 June to 1 September 2022. This season brought in several new cups, such as the Fossil Cup, where Water, Rock and Steel-types are only allowed. Little Cup Remix debuted for the first time, banning four Pokémon that were used from the previous Little Cup during the Interlude Season. Bronzor, Cottonee, Deino and Kantoian Vulpix weren’t allowed to participate in the Little Cup Remix. Hisui Cup had the same rules as Sinnoh Cup but with added Pokémon that had a Hisuian form. The Summer Cup allowed Normal, Fire, Water, Electric, Bug and Grass types. The Fighting Cup had the same type of meta as the Flying Cup however Psychic-types are banned.

Season 12 
Season 12, officially known as the Season of Light ran from 1 September to 1 December 2022. This season brought in a lot of new cups, which are the Little Jungle Cup Remix, Psychic Cup, Weather Cup, Evolution Cup, Halloween Cup: Ultra League Edition, Willpower Cup and Element Cup Remix. Little Jungle Cup Remix banned the three most used Pokémon in the last Little Jungle Cup from trainers Ace Rank and up: Skorupi, Cottonee and Ducklett, in addition to Shuckle, Smeargle and Salandit. The Psychic Cup had the same type of meta as the Fighting and Flying Cups from the previous season however Mew is banned. The Weather Cup was the first special cup in the GO Battle League to be in the Ultra League (outside of Premier and Remix). It only allowed Fire, Water, Ice and Rock-type Pokémon to compete. The Evolution Cup only allowed second stage Pokémon and its CP cap was 1500 (e.g. Zweilous, Vigoroth, Hakamo-o, Dragonair, Machoke, etc.) Halloween Cup returned and for the first time, it had an Ultra League edition. The Willpower Cup allows Fighting, Psychic and Dark-type Pokémon to compete with Gardevoir banned. Element Cup Remix played the same rules as Element Cup however Chinchou, Cottonee, Ducklett and Salandit are banned from competing.

This season also featured the return of Premier Cup Classic plus Ultra League Premier Level 50 after UL Premier Level 50 had been absent from the GO Battle League since Season 8.

Championships

2022 Championship Series 
The 2022 Pokémon GO Championship Series is a series with a purpose of acting as a qualification system to the 2022 Pokémon World Championship. The series consists of events spread throughout the globe. The series is divided into the Senior's and Master's divisions. The series' format revolves around the Great League. Players can enter the championship either by attaining Legend rank during either Season 9 or Season 10 of the GO Battle League, or by registering via Play! Pokémon after the Legend-rank registration closes. Every event is divided between a regional or international event. The top Pokémon players at these events would be given an invitation to the 2022 World Championship. The earliest event began on 26 March, in Liverpool, with the latest being on 24 June, in Columbus, Ohio.

A list of events featured in the series is listed below:

References

Go Battle League
Software features